Alexander Horváth (28 December 1938 – 31 August 2022) was a Slovak footballer who played as a defender. He made 26 appearances for the Czechoslovakia scoring 3 goals.

Horváth was a participant at the 1970 FIFA World Cup. He played mostly for Slovan Bratislava and also briefly for R. Daring Club Molenbeek in Belgium, where he emigrated to. Horváth coached R.W.D. Molenbeek and Sakaryaspor.

References

External links
Alex Horváth on Mackolik

1938 births
2022 deaths
People from Turčianske Teplice District
Sportspeople from the Žilina Region
Czechoslovak emigrants to Belgium
Slovak footballers
Czechoslovak footballers
Association football defenders
Czechoslovakia international footballers
Czechoslovakia youth international footballers
1970 FIFA World Cup players
MŠK Žilina players
ŠK Slovan Bratislava players
R.W.D. Molenbeek players
Slovak football managers
Czechoslovak football managers
R.W.D. Molenbeek managers
Sakaryaspor managers
R.A.A. Louviéroise managers
Czechoslovak expatriate footballers
Czechoslovak expatriate football managers
Czechoslovak expatriate sportspeople in Belgium
Expatriate footballers in Belgium
Czechoslovak expatriate sportspeople in Turkey
Expatriate football managers in Turkey